Harvey Allen Silverglate (born May 10, 1942)  is an attorney, journalist, writer, and co-founder of the Foundation for Individual Rights in Education (FIRE).

Silverglate was a member of the board of the Massachusetts chapter of the American Civil Liberties Union and also taught at Harvard Law School, the University of Massachusetts Boston, and at the Cambridge Rindge and Latin School.

He is an attorney in Cambridge, Massachusetts. He practices in academic freedom, civil liberties,  criminal defense,  and students' rights cases.

He co-founded FIRE with Alan Charles Kors. He served as chairman of the board of directors, and remains a member of the board.

Early life and education
He holds degrees from Princeton University (cum laude, 1964) and Harvard Law School (1967). He is a practicing attorney, specializing in civil liberties litigation, criminal defense, academic freedom, and students' rights cases. He is Of Counsel to the Boston-based law firm Zalkind Duncan & Bernstein.

Career
In addition to his law practice, Silverglate is also a journalist and writer. He was a columnist for the Boston Phoenix, writing on politics, law, and civil liberties. He also wrote a regular column for Forbes.com, and has written columns and op-eds for the Wall Street Journal, the Boston Globe, the Los Angeles Times, the National Law Journal, Reason magazine, Massachusetts Lawyers Weekly, and other publications. He authored two books, The Shadow University: The Betrayal of Liberty on America's Campuses (co-authored with Alan Kors) and Three Felonies a Day, which details the extension of vague federal criminal laws into daily conduct that would not be readily seen as criminal.

Silverglate was a featured speaker at a rally by Demand Progress in memory of Aaron Swartz and wrote an op-ed for Massachusetts Lawyers Weekly about his prosecution by the U.S. Attorney's Office. Lawyers familiar with the case told him the Middlesex County District Attorney's plan had been to resolve Swartz's case by having it "...continued without a finding, with Swartz duly admonished and then returned to civil society to continue his pioneering electronic work in a less legally questionable manner." As he explained to CNET's Declan McCullaghUnder such a disposition, the charge is held in abeyance ("continued") without any verdict ("without a finding"). The defendant is on probation for a period of a few months up to maybe a couple of years at the most; if the defendant does not get into further legal trouble, the charge is dismissed, and the defendant has no criminal record. This is what the lawyers expected to happen when Swartz was arrested."Tragedy intervened", Silverglate wrote in Massachusetts Lawyers Weekly, "when [United States Attorney Carmen] Ortiz's office took over the case to 'send a message".

Silverglate was a candidate in the 2009 Harvard Board of Overseers elections. After collecting 315 signatures from Harvard alumni, he was nominated as a petition candidate in early February 2009. His platform focused on reforming the student disciplinary board, eliminating speech codes, and restoring the student voice in university outreach efforts. His campaign had been covered in The Boston Globe and the Harvard Law Record, and he made an appearance on Greater Boston with Emily Rooney. Election results were announced at commencement, June 4, 2009, and Silverglate finished in eighth place, with 11,700 votes, 1600 short of winning a seat.

Silverglate was married to the portrait photographer Elsa Dorfman, who died on May 30, 2020. Their son Isaac lives in New York City.

Books
 Three Felonies a Day: How the Feds Target the Innocent (September 2009), Encounter Books
 The Shadow University: The Betrayal Of Liberty On America's Campuses by Alan Charles Kors (Author) and Harvey A. Silverglate (Author)  (1999)
 Conviction Machine: Standing Up to Federal Prosecutorial Abuse by Sidney Powell and Harvey A. Silverglate (2019)

See also 
 Nothing to hide argument

References

External links
 Foundation for Individual Rights in Education
 
 Harvey Silverglate.com

Living people
1942 births
Massachusetts lawyers
American political writers
American male non-fiction writers
Free speech activists
Harvard Law School alumni
Harvard Law School faculty
Princeton University alumni
Lawyers from Cambridge, Massachusetts
Place of birth missing (living people)
Writers from Brooklyn